George Johann Scharf (1788–1860) was a water color painter, draughtsman and lithographer, and father of Sir George Scharf and Henry Scharf. He exhibited his paintings at the Royal Academy from 1817 to 1850, and was a member of the New Society of Painters in Water Colours.

Early life

George Scharf was born in Bavaria in 1788. After receiving little formal education, he went to Munich in 1804 where he studied for a time under Professor Hauber and copied pictures in the Pinakothek (Neue Pinakothek). King Maximilian noticed the young artist and purchased his copy of a portrait of Prince Eugène de Beauharnais. After working for a few years as a miniature painter and drawing master, Scharf learned the technique of lithography, which had been recently invented by his fellow countryman Alois Senefelder. Scharf left Germany and wandered for five years in France and the Low Countries. Caught up in the siege of Antwerp in 1814, Scharf escaped and joined the English army, where he was appointed lieutenant of baggage in the engineer department. In this capacity he was present at the Battle of Waterloo and accompanied the allied armies to Paris. While there, he drew some views of the Bois de Boulogne. Advised to try his fortune in England, Scharf left on New Year's Day 1816 and came to London, where he became a successful illustrator of ordinary life in England.

Professional Life in England

After Scharf arrived in London, he married Elizabeth Hicks, his landlady's sister, and lived in a house on St. Martin's Lane. At the time, London was a thriving center for lithography, and Scharf was able to make a respectable living off his topographical views and genre scenes, which were easily transformed into prints. Although George Scharf's life has not been as well-documented as that of his son, he has left to posterity over a thousand drawings, watercolours and lithographs that chronicle London life in the first half of the 19th Century. Most of these works are stored in the British Museum. It was Scharf's ambition to be "taken seriously as a ‘gentleman’ artist rather than as the ‘artisan’ printmaker  on which his fame rests today.

During his first years in London, Scharf concentrated on drawing historic events, such as the Westminster Elections of 1818. He then branched out, creating genre images of daily life for German publishers who had settled in London, such as Rudolph Ackermann,< and illustrations for a number of London's scientific institutions, such as the Zoological and Geological Societies and the Royal College of Surgeons. Many examples of his skill are contained in the Transactions of the Geological Society and the works of Dr Buckland, Sir Richard Owen, and Professor Sedgwick. He also painted many diagrams of scientific and antiquarian subjects. In 1817, he sent four portraits to the Royal Academy, and from 1826 was a frequent exhibitor, chiefly of topographical views both at the academy and with the New Society of Painters in Water Colours, of which he was elected a member in 1833. In 1830 Scharf made a lithographic print based on Henry De la Beche's Duria Antiquior watercolour, which is credited as being the first scene of prehistoric life from deep time to be widely circulated.
 
His drawings brought him into contact with Charles Darwin, who commissioned Scharf for a series of illustrations of fossil bones from South America. But the two men had a falling out, for Darwin felt that Scharf's price was too high and that he was being "ripped off." After this event, Scharf's future commissions with scientific institutions began to dry up, and in his last years, Scharf struggled to sell his work.

Family
Scharf died at 29 Great George Street, Westminster, on 11 November 1860, and was buried in the Brompton cemetery. He was survived by his wife Elizabeth Hicks, who lived until 1869, and two sons, George, afterwards Sir George Scharf, and Henry Scharf. After his death Scharf's wife sold over a thousand of his drawings and watercolours to the British Museum.

Exhibitions at the Royal Academy
This information was taken from The Royal Academy of Arts; a complete dictionary of contributors and their work from its foundation in 1769 to 1904

External links
Art Review: George Scharf's London
Sir John Soane's Museum Newsletter, Spring 2009, p 3-5
George Scharf, Chronicler of 19th Century London

Paintings and Illustrations
Base of the Skull of Toxodos Platensis, 1832–36
The Gallery of New Society of Painters, Victoria & Albert Museum
Westmacott Lecturing at Somerset House, Royal Academy of Art
Westminster Elections, Covent Garden
Images from the 2009 Sir John Soane museum exhibit
Digital Image Collections at the John Carter Brown Library

References

1788 births
1860 deaths
Artists from London
English illustrators